Thomas or Tom Holmes may refer to:
Thomas Holmes (mortician) (1817–?), American mortician
Thomas William Holmes (1898–1950), Canadian recipient of the Victoria Cross
Thomas Holmes, 1st Baron Holmes (1699–1764), English Member of Parliament
Thomas J. Holmes (c. 1819–1867), mayor of Portland, Oregon, 1866–1867
Tom Holmes (politician) (born 1931), chairman of the far-right British political party the National Front
Tom Holmes (rugby union) (born 1990), rugby union player
Tom Holmes (rugby league) (born 1996), rugby league footballer
Tom Holmes (footballer) (born 2000), English footballer
Tom Holmes (artist) (born 1979), American artist 
Thomas Holmes (executive), American executive
Thomas Holmes (politician) (born 1949), American former politician
T. Rice Holmes (Thomas Rice Edward Holmes, 1855–1933), scholar
Tommy Holmes (1917–2008), American baseball player and manager
Tommy Holmes (sportswriter), American sports writer
Thomas A. Holmes (1804–1888), American surveyor, trader, and politician

See also
Thomas Fraser-Holmes (born 1991), Australian swimmer
Thomas Holme (disambiguation)
Thomas Holm (disambiguation)